The Ontology Lookup Service (OLS) is a repository for biomedical ontologies, part of the ELIXIR infrastructure. It is supported by the European Bioinformatics Institute (EMBL-EBI).

References

External links 

 Ontology Lookup Service

Ontology (information science)
Science and technology in Cambridgeshire
South Cambridgeshire District